Malcolm Bailey may refer to:
 Malcolm Bailey (footballer, born 1950)
 Malcolm Bailey (footballer, born 1937)
 Malcolm Bailey (artist)